Graphic State Limited was a British video game developer based in Leamington Spa, Warwickshire, England. The company was founded by Claire Hill and Richard Whittall in 1997, specializing in games for the Game Boy Color and Game Boy Advance handheld devices, and operating Graphic State Wireless, a division developing games for mobile phones and PDAs. Graphic State shut down in 2003, leaving two publisher-less projects cancelled.

Games developed

References 

Defunct companies of England
Companies based in Leamington Spa
Video game development companies
Defunct video game companies of the United Kingdom
Video game companies established in 1997
Video game companies disestablished in 2003